Emmanuil Genrikhovich Kazakevich (February 24, 1913 – September 22, 1962) was a Soviet author, poet and playwright of Jewish extraction, writing in Russian and Yiddish.

Biography

Early life
Kazakevich was born at Kremenchuk in Ukraine (then part of Imperial Russia) in 1913 and received training as an engineer at Kharkiv. In the early 1930s he moved to the Jewish autonomous region of Birobidzhan on the Amur River, where he became the chairman of a local kolkhoz and also ran a theatre. During these years he began writing and publishing poems and stories in Yiddish. In 1941 he was in Moscow, taking part in the defence efforts of the capital and later joining the regular Red Army for frontier service. His war service brought him close to some of the major battles of 1943-45 and finally into the battle for Berlin; by this time he had become assistant director of intelligence in one of the armies involved.

Career
After 1945 Kazakevich began writing in Russian, and his debut short story Zvezda ("The Star", 1947, adapted into a film in 1949 (remake - film 2002)) was an instant success and awarded a Stalin Prize for literature. The story describes an army intelligence unit during WW2 and their raid behind enemy lines. It showcases some of his later recurrent traits: the sharp, lyrical evocation of nature, the interest in moral conflicts and ambiguities, often relating to the transition between war and peace, the sense of humour and psychological observation. Many of his later stories are set during or shortly after the Second World War. Kazakevich's 1948 story "Dvoe v stepi" ("Two in the Steppe", adapted into a 1964 film and a 2015 remake "On the Road to Berlin"), was fiercely criticized in the Party press but that did not prevent his next story "Vesna na Odere" ("Spring on the Oder River," 1949) from being awarded a second Stalin Prize. The novella "In the Light of Day" (1960) explores ambiguities of guilt, bravery and memory as a soldier makes a visit to the widow of his fallen friend and unit officer.

During the fifties, Kazakevich reached high positions in the Soviet Association of Writers and was aligned with the efforts of de-Stalinization. He kept picking up potentially sensitive subjects, and during his last years may have been working on a major novel about Lenin during the revolutionary years. The short novel Sinyaya tetrad (The Blue notebook) appeared in 1961; it is set during Lenin's stay on the Karelian isthmus in the summer of 1917 and brings Lenin face to face both with ordinary people and with Grigory Zinovyev, who was still considered a traitor or at best a dubious figure at the time of writing. While Kazakevich, in the end, makes Lenin refute Zinovyev's fears and allegations, there is no attempt to show the latter as an evil or insincere person, which would have been a given for most Soviet writers at the time.

Kazakevich continued with Lenin as a main character in another story, "Enemies", written in his last year, and it is likely that he was planning to bring them together within a larger novel about Lenin. However, his sudden passing away in the summer of 1962 meant that those plans were left unfulfilled.

Works
English translations
Star: A Story, Foreign Languages Publishing House, 1952.
Heart of a Friend: A Story, Foreign Languages Publishing House, 1952.
Hungarian meetings, - his travel notes on Russian, 1955 (The Hungarian Revolution was in 1956).
The House on the Square, Foreign Languages Publishing House, 1957.
Selected Works, Progress Publishers, 1978.
The Blue Notebook, Fredonia Books, 2002.

References

 Kazakevich, Emmanuil: Den blå anteckningsboken ("The Blue Notebook and two other stories"), translated into Swedish by H. Björkegren; introduction gives biographical information. Askild & Kärnekull, Stockholm/Progress, Moscow, 1978

1913 births
1962 deaths
People from Kremenchuk
Ukrainian Jews
Jewish poets
Yiddish-language poets
Soviet novelists
Soviet male writers
20th-century Russian male writers
Russian male novelists
Russian male poets
20th-century Russian poets